is a Japanese politician and member of the House of Representatives for the Japanese Communist Party, of which he is the policy chief. He is critical of the United States' intervention in the Syrian Civil War in absence of resolutions by the UN Security Council, saying that the actions are aggravating the civil war. He is supportive of normalizing Japan's relationship with North Korea, claiming that the issues with North Korea can only be solved by developing a dialogue and trust. He similarly thinks that Japan should push the United States to hold talks with North Korea to avert a war caused by accident or misunderstanding. Kasai is against the Trans-Pacific Partnership.

References

1952 births
Living people
University of Tokyo alumni
Members of the House of Representatives (Japan)
Members of the House of Councillors (Japan)
Japanese Communist Party politicians
21st-century Japanese politicians